Binabaj (also Romanized as Bīnābāj and Beynābāj; also known as Beynāvāj) is a village in Nimbeluk Rural District, Nimbeluk District, Qaen County, South Khorasan Province, Iran. At the 2006 census, its population was 569, in 171 families.

References 

Populated places in Qaen County